The following are albums and appearances by Zakk Wylde, guitarist for Ozzy Osbourne, lead vocalist and guitarist of Black Label Society, and lead guitarist and vocalist in Pride & Glory. He has also released two solo albums, Book of Shadows in 1996 and Book of Shadows II in 2016.

Solo albums

Singles

As featured artist

Instructional works

Albums and books

Videos

With Pride & Glory

With Black Label Society

With Ozzy Osbourne

With Zakk Sabbath

Guest appearances

Music videos

Other appearances

References

External links 

 

Discographies of American artists